All Saints Sandy Hill is a former Anglican church in Ottawa, Ontario, Canada. The building was sold in 2015 and is currently a community hub for the neighbourhood.

History
The Anglican Diocese of Ottawa was only two-years-old when on 15 April 1898, Mr Henry Newell Bate (Chairman of the Ottawa Improvement Commission) asked Bishop Charles Hamilton to form a new parish in Ottawa. By 24 June, all of the necessary preparations had been made.  Bate laid the first stone himself on 2 April 1899. The chief cornerstone was laid by the Bishop on 7 June that same year. The first services were held in the church on 4 February 1900. The first Rector of All Saints’ was the Reverend A. W. Mackay, the former Curate of the old Saint John's Anglican Church, which was on Sussex Street where the Connaught Building stands today. He held this post until his death in August 1919.

The church, however, was not consecrated until the 1 February 1914. This was done following the decision by (now Sir) Henry Bate to give the church and land to the Rector and his wardens as a gift on 21 January.

The church at Chapel Street at Laurier Avenue, which was designed 1898-99 by Alfred Merigon Calderon, is of Gothic revival design.
The church features a crenellated tower with a nine-bell chime, and no fewer than fourteen stained glass windows.  Commemorated by memorial windows, are MacKay, Sir Robert Laird Borden, Prime Minister from 1911 to 1920, and several other former members of the congregation. In 1934, Bate Memorial Hall was added by Thomas Cameron Bate (son of Sir Henry Bate)  in honour of the church's founder. The church also held the state funeral for Sir Robert Borden, in 1937.

In 2014, the church community merged with St. Margaret's Anglican Church, Vanier, and the historic building was put up for sale. The site was purchased in December 2015 by All Saints Development Inc., who plan to turn the site into a community hub containing a wedding venue, a conference centre, and other amenities. The space will also be an interpretive centre for Prime Minister's Row, an improvement initiative for the historical neighbourhood.

References

 Also .
 C.H. Little, All Saints Church (Sandy Hill), a short history 1898-1975  (Ottawa, Anglican Book Society) 365.L.07.1

External links

Gothic Revival architecture in Ottawa
Anglican church buildings in Ottawa
Churches completed in 1900
Gothic Revival church buildings in Canada
Designated heritage properties in Ottawa
Former churches in Canada
Former Anglican churches
19th-century Anglican church buildings in Canada
20th-century churches in Canada